Marionettes of Desire (German:Marionetten der Leidenschaft) is a 1919 German silent film directed by Lupu Pick and starring Bernd Aldor, Paul Biensfeldt and Edith Posca.

References

Bibliography
 Jill Nelmes & Jule Selbo. Women Screenwriters: An International Guide. Palgrave Macmillan, 2015.

External links

1919 films
Films of the Weimar Republic
Films directed by Lupu Pick
German silent feature films
German black-and-white films
1910s German films